Zlokuḱane is a village in the municipality of Lipkovo, North Macedonia.

Demographics
As of the 2021 census, Zlokuḱane had 3 residents with the following ethnic composition:
Persons for whom data are taken from administrative sources 3

According to the 2002 census, the village had a total of 12 inhabitants. Ethnic groups in the village include:
Albanians 12

References

External links

Villages in Lipkovo Municipality
Albanian communities in North Macedonia